Ismael Avila (born 22 September 1949) is a Mexican racewalker. He competed in the men's 20 kilometres walk at the 1972 Summer Olympics.

References

1949 births
Living people
Athletes (track and field) at the 1972 Summer Olympics
Mexican male racewalkers
Olympic athletes of Mexico
Place of birth missing (living people)
20th-century Mexican people